Enemy of the State is a 1998 American political action thriller film directed by Tony Scott, produced by Jerry Bruckheimer and written by David Marconi.  The film stars Will Smith and Gene Hackman and features an ensemble supporting cast consisting of Jon Voight, Lisa Bonet, Gabriel Byrne, Dan Butler, Loren Dean, Jack Black, Jake Busey, Barry Pepper, and Regina King. The film tells the story of a group of corrupt National Security Agency (NSA) agents conspiring to kill a congressman and the cover-up that ensues after a tape of the murder ends up in the possession of an unsuspecting lawyer.

Enemy of the State was released on November 20, 1998 by Buena Vista Pictures through its Touchstone Pictures label. The film grossed $250.8 million worldwide, and garnered positive reviews from film critics, with many praising the writing and direction as well as the chemistry between Smith and Hackman.

Plot
Senior NSA agent Thomas Reynolds meets in a public park with Congressman Phil Hammersley to discuss a new piece of counterterrorism legislation that dramatically expands the surveillance powers of American intelligence agencies over individuals and groups. Hammersley remains committed to blocking its passage, arguing that the potential benefits of the bill aren't worth sacrificing the privacy rights of ordinary citizens. Reynolds, wanting the bill passed to obtain a long-delayed promotion, has a team of agents loyal to him murder Hammersley and stage his death as a car accident following a heart attack.

Labor lawyer Robert Clayton "Bobby" Dean is working with his firm on a case involving restaurant owner and mob boss Paulie Pintero. Dean meets with his ex-girlfriend, Rachel Banks; Rachel works for "Brill," a man Dean occasionally hires to conduct surveillance operations but has never met in person. She delivers a tape incriminating Pintero for labor racketeering, which Dean threatens him with to ensure the mobster agrees to a favorable settlement.

Reynolds and his team spot a biologist swapping out a tape from a remote wildlife camera stationed across the lake from the murder scene. They identify him as Daniel Zavitz. When Zavitz views footage of the murder, he immediately contacts a journalist to publicize the tape. Reynolds' team intercepts the call and rush to Zavitz's apartment. Zavitz transfers the video to a disc and hides it in an NEC TurboExpress game console before fleeing. He bumps into Dean, his old college friend. Panicked, Zavitz slips the disc into Dean's shopping bag without his knowledge. He runs into the path of an oncoming fire truck and is killed instantly, while Reynolds has Zavitz's journalist contact murdered.

After Reynolds' team identify Dean and figure Zavitz slipped him the footage disc, they visit him disguised as cops. When Dean refuses to let them search his belongings, the agents erroneously believe that he is knowingly withholding the disc. They break in Dean's house while he and his family are out and plant bugs on his clothes and personal effects. They also disseminate false evidence that Dean is laundering money through his firm for Pintero and having an affair with Rachel. The subterfuge destroys Dean's life: he is fired from his law firm, his bank accounts are frozen pending a federal investigation, and his wife, Carla, throws him out. Dean asks Rachel to contact Brill for help. Reynolds intercepts the call and sends one of his men to impersonate Brill. The real Brill rescues Dean and warns him that the NSA is responsible for ruining his life. After Dean manages to evade the team, he is horrified to find Rachel murdered in her home to silence her and him framed for the murder.

Dean finds the disc and shows it to Brill, who identifies Reynolds. The NSA agents raid Brill's hideout; Brill and Dean escape but the disc is destroyed when Brill is forced to set off explosives. Brill reveals that he is really Edward Lyle, a former NSA communications expert stationed in Iran during the Iranian Revolution. His partner, Rachel's father, was killed, but Lyle escaped and has been working covertly ever since, employing Rachel as a courier to watch over her. Lyle urges Dean to start a new life, but he insists on clearing his name. Dean and Lyle trail Sam Albert, a key supporter of the bill, and record a videotape of him with his mistress. Dean and Lyle hide an NSA listening device in Albert's hotel room, knowing that he will find it. Lyle then hacks into Reynolds' personal bank account and deposits large sums of money to make it look like he's being paid to blackmail Albert.

A meeting is arranged with Reynolds to exchange the video so Reynolds can be tricked into incriminating himself. Reynolds' men instead ambush the meeting and hold Lyle and Dean at gunpoint, demanding the tape. Dean, anticipating this, lies and says that the evidence is hidden at Pintero's restaurant, which is currently under FBI surveillance. He then tricks Pintero and Reynolds into believing that the other man has the "tape". The encounter immediately escalates into a deadly close-quarters firefight when a gangster shoots an NSA agent in the back; Pintero, his men, Reynolds, and most of the agents are all killed. During this ordeal, Lyle sends the FBI a live feed of the incident to trigger a raid on the restaurant before slipping out in disguise. Dean is rescued, and the conspiracy is exposed.

Congress abandons the bill to avoid scandal, while the NSA executes a cover-up of Reynolds' actions. Dean is cleared of all charges and reconciles with Carla. Lyle sends Dean a "farewell" message via his TV, partially showing himself relaxing on a tropical island with his cat.

Cast

 Will Smith as Robert Clayton "Bobby" Dean
 Gene Hackman as Edward "Brill" Lyle, an alias of Harry Caul
 Jon Voight as NSA Department Head Thomas Brian Reynolds
 Regina King as Carla Dean
 Loren Dean as NSA Agent Hicks, Reynolds' aide-de-camp
 Jake Busey as Krug, a USMC veteran and NSA field operative
 Barry Pepper as NSA Agent David Pratt
 Jason Lee as Daniel Leon Zavitz
 Gabriel Byrne as the Brill imposter who tries to kidnap Dean
 Lisa Bonet as Rachel Banks
 Jack Black as NSA Agent Fiedler, a surveillance analyst
 Jamie Kennedy as NSA Agent Jamie Williams
 Scott Caan as Jones, Hicks' partner
 James LeGros as Jerry Miller, managing partner of Dean's firm
 Stuart Wilson as Congressman Sam Albert
 Ian Hart as NSA Agent John Bingham
 Jascha Washington as Eric Dean
 Anna Gunn as Emily Reynolds
 Grant Heslov as Lenny Bloom
 Bodhi Elfman as NSA Agent Van
 Dan Butler as NSA Director Admiral Shaffer
 Jason Robards as Congressman Philip Hammersley
 Seth Green as NSA Agent Selby,
 Tom Sizemore as Paulie Pintero
 Philip Baker Hall as Mark Silverberg
 Brian Markinson as Brian Blake
 Larry King as Himself

Production
The story is set in both Washington, D.C., and Baltimore, and most of the filming was done in Baltimore. Location shooting began on a ferry in Fell's Point. In mid-January, the company moved to Los Angeles to complete production in April 1998. David Marconi spent over 2 1/2 years developing his original script at Don Simpson-Jerry Bruckheimer Films under the direction of Lucas Foster, their development executive at the time. Oliver Stone expressed early interest in directing Marconi's script, but ultimately Bruckheimer went with Tony Scott who he had a long standing relationship with because of their previous collaborations. The writers Aaron Sorkin, Henry Bean and Tony Gilroy each performed an uncredited rewrite of the script.

Mel Gibson and Tom Cruise were considered for the part that went to Will Smith, who took the role largely because he wanted to work with Hackman, and had previously enjoyed working with the producer Jerry Bruckheimer on Bad Boys. George Clooney was also considered for a role in the film. Sean Connery was considered for the role that went to Hackman. The film is notable for having cast several soon-to-be stars in smaller supporting roles, which casting director Victoria Thomas credited to people's interest in working with Gene Hackman.

The film's crew included a technical surveillance counter-measures consultant who also had a minor role as a spy shop merchant. Hackman had previously acted in a similar thriller about spying and surveillance, The Conversation (1974). The photo in Edward Lyle's NSA file is of Hackman in The Conversation.

Reception

Box office
Enemy of the State grossed $111.5 million in the United States and $139.3 million in other territories, for a worldwide total of $250.8 million, against a production budget of $90 million.

The film opened at #2, behind The Rugrats Movie, grossing $20 million over its first weekend at 2,393 theaters, averaging $8,374 per venue. It made $18.1 million in its second weekend and $9.7 million in its third, finishing third place both times.

Critical response
On the review aggregator website Rotten Tomatoes, the film holds an approval rating of 70% based on 84 reviews, with an average rating of 6.44/10. The website's critics consensus reads: "An entertaining, topical thriller that finds director Tony Scott on solid form and Will Smith confirming his action headliner status." Metacritic assigned the film a normalized score of 67 out of 100, based on 22 critics, indicating "generally favorable reviews". Audiences polled by CinemaScore gave the film an average grade of A− on an A+ to F scale.

Kenneth Turan of the Los Angeles Times expressed enjoyment in the movie, noting how its "pizazz [overcame] occasional lapses in moment-to-moment plausibility". Janet Maslin of The New York Times approved of the film's action-packed sequences, but cited how it was similar in manner to the rest of the members of "Simpson's and Bruckheimer's school of empty but sensation-packed filming. In a combination of the two's views, Edvins Beitiks of the San Francisco Examiner praised many of the movie's development aspects, but criticized the overall concept that drove the film from the beginning — the efficiency of government intelligence — as unrealistic. Roger Ebert of The Chicago Sun-Times felt "the climax edges perilously close to the ridiculous" but overall enjoyed the film, particularly Voight and Hackman's performances.

Kim Newman considered Enemy of the State a "continuation of The Conversation", the 1974 psychological thriller that starred Hackman as a paranoid, isolated surveillance expert.

Possible television series
In October 2016, ABC announced it had green-lit a television series sequel to the film, with Bruckheimer to return as producer. The series would take place two decades after the original film, where "an elusive NSA spy is charged with leaking classified intelligence, an idealistic female attorney must partner with a hawkish FBI agent to stop a global conspiracy". However, nothing ever came to fruition.

Real life

An episode of PBS' Nova titled "Spy Factory" reported that the film's portrayal of the NSA's capabilities was fiction: although the agency can intercept transmissions, connecting the dots is difficult. However, in 2001, the then-NSA director Gen. Michael Hayden, who was appointed to the position during the release of the film, told CNN's Kyra Phillips that "I made the judgment that we couldn't survive with the popular impression of this agency being formed by the last Will Smith movie." James Risen wrote in his 2006 book State of War: The Secret History of the CIA and the Bush Administration that Hayden "was appalled" by the film's depiction of the NSA, and sought to counter it with a PR campaign on behalf of the agency.

Given the events of 9/11, the Patriot Act and Edward Snowden's revelations about the NSA's PRISM surveillance program, the film has become noteworthy for being ahead of its time regarding issues of national security and privacy.

In June 2013, the NSA's PRISM and Boundless Informant programs for domestic and international surveillance were uncovered by The Guardian and The Washington Post as the result of information provided by the whistleblower Edward Snowden. This information revealed capabilities such as collection of Internet browsing, e-mail and telephone data of not only many Americans, but citizens of other nations as well. The Guardians John Patterson argued that Hollywood depictions of NSA surveillance, including Enemy of the State and Echelon Conspiracy, had "softened" up the American public to "the notion that our spending habits, our location, our every movement and conversation, are visible to others whose motives we cannot know".

See also
 List of films featuring surveillance
 List of American films of 1998
 Patriot Act
 The Net (1995 film)

References

External links

 
 
 
 
 

1998 films
1998 action thriller films
1990s American films
1990s chase films
1990s English-language films
1990s political thriller films
American action thriller films
American chase films
American political thriller films
Films about the American Mafia
Films about computing
Films about the Central Intelligence Agency
Films about the Federal Bureau of Investigation
Films about the National Security Agency
Films about security and surveillance
Films directed by Tony Scott
Films produced by Jerry Bruckheimer
Films scored by Harry Gregson-Williams
Films scored by Trevor Rabin
Films set in Baltimore
Films set in Washington, D.C.
Films shot in Baltimore
Films shot in Los Angeles
Political action films
Scott Free Productions films
Techno-thriller films
Touchstone Pictures films